Ninh Phước is a district (huyện) of Ninh Thuận province in the Southeast region of Vietnam. It is also known as "Phu Quy". The city is growing at a fairly fast rate compared to other cities in Vietnam. The city has many beaches and resorts that are in the making.

Ninh Phước has many farmers usually cultivating grapes and rice. Oxen are abundant. The city is currently underdeveloped. A typical meal from a shop would cost about 7,000.00 đồng, or about US$0.50.

The primary transportation in the city consists of bikes and mopeds.

Notes 

Districts of Ninh Thuận province